Idaea mustelata is a moth of the family Geometridae. In Europe it is only found on the Iberian Peninsula. It is also found in North Africa, from Morocco up to Western Algeria. It was considered a subspecies of Idaea rusticata up to 2004 when it was re-instated at species level by Axel Hausmann.

The wingspan is 12–16 mm. The moth flies from July to August depending on the location.

The larval food plants are unknown

External links

 Fauna Europaea
 Moths and Butterflies of Europe and North Africa
 Lepiforum.de
 Insectarium virtual

Sterrhini
Moths of Africa
Moths of Europe
Moths described in 1892